Below are the squads for the 1950 FIFA World Cup final tournament in Brazil. This was the first World Cup where the players' jerseys featured back numbers (allowed in football since 1944), though no teams had fixed numbers for each player. (That would only be compulsory from the next World Cup, in 1954.) Thus, the players are ordered by name.

The only national team player who played his regular league football with a foreign club was George Robledo of Chile, who played in England's Football League First Division.

Group 1

Brazil
Head coach: Flávio Costa

Switzerland
Head coach: Franco Andreoli

Felice Soldini travel with the team but was ineligible to play

Yugoslavia 
Head coach: Milorad Arsenijević

Mexico 
Head coach: Octavio Vial

Group 2

Spain 
Head coach: Guillermo Eizaguirre

England 
Head coach: Walter Winterbottom

Chile 
Head coach: Alberto Buccicardi

United States 
Head coach: William Jeffrey

Group 3

Sweden
Head coach:  George Raynor

Italy 
Head coach: Ferruccio Novo

Paraguay 
Head coach: Manuel Fleitas Solich

Group 4

Uruguay
Head coach: Juan López

Bolivia 
Head coach: 
Mario Pretto

Notes
Each national team had to submit a squad of 22 players. Each squad included two goalkeepers, except Switzerland, Spain, Sweden and Italy who called three. George Robledo of Newcastle United was the only player to play for a club outside of his country in the tournament.

References

 weltfussball.de 

Squads
FIFA World Cup squads